Peggy Does Her Darndest is a lost 1919 silent film comedy directed by George D. Baker and starring May Allison. It was produced and distributed by Metro Pictures.

Melodramatic comedy of an athletic girl Peggy Ensloe played by May Allison.

Cast
May Allison as Peggy Ensloe
Rosemary Theby as Eleanor Ensloe
Frank Currier as Edward Ensloe
Augustus Phillips as Lonesome Larry Doyle
Robert Ellis as Honorable Hugh Wentworth
Wilton Taylor as Nick Nolan
Richard Rosson as Bob Ensloe
Sylvia Ashton as Mrs. Ensloe
Ernest Morrison as Snowball Snow

References

External links

1919 films
Lost American films
American silent feature films
Films directed by George D. Baker
Metro Pictures films
American black-and-white films
Silent American comedy films
1919 comedy films
1919 lost films
Lost comedy films
1910s American films